Men's 50 metre rifle three positions was the last rifle event to be concluded at the 2000 Summer Olympics, on 23 September. The qualification round, consisting of 40 shots from each position, began at 09:00 Australian Eastern Standard Time (UTC+10), and the final round of 10 additional shots standing at 13:15. World record holder Rajmond Debevec won the competition and his first Olympic medal, setting two new Olympic records.

Records
Prior to this competition, the existing World and Olympic records were as follows.

Qualification round

OR Olympic record – Q Qualified for final

Final

OR Olympic record

References

Sources

Shooting at the 2000 Summer Olympics
Men's 050m 3 positions 2000
Men's events at the 2000 Summer Olympics